Tamdult (also Tamedoult, Tamdlt;) was a medieval city located near the Draa river south-east of Akka, Morocco. It was an important and flourishing stop in the Trans-Saharan trade route, linking Nul (Asrir) and Ouadane to Sijilmasa, Massa and N'fis. The city was founded in the second century BC by the Berbers Shilha. In the ninth century  one the sons of Idriss II, founder of the Idrisid dynasty, who had been given a principality in the Sous to reign over the Lamta tribe.

The city and its fortress were allegedly destroyed in the 14th century by a king of the Marinid dynasty. Today, the shrine of Sidi Mohamed ben Abdallah Ichanaoui is the only surviving structure in the ruins site.

See also
Akka
Sijilmasa
Sous

References

Medieval Morocco
Oases of Morocco
Former populated places in Morocco
History of the Sahara
9th-century establishments in Morocco
14th-century disestablishments in Africa